The 2006 South Florida Bulls football team represented the University of South Florida (USF) in the 2006 NCAA Division I FBS football season.  Their head coach was Jim Leavitt and they played all of their home games at Raymond James Stadium in Tampa, Florida.  The 2006 college football season was the tenth season overall for the Bulls and their second season in the Big East Conference.

Schedule

References

South Florida Bulls
South Florida Bulls football seasons
Birmingham Bowl champion seasons
South Florida Bulls f